Muti Media is a 2003 album by the Kalahari Surfers, the recording identity of South African musician Warrick Sony. It features a sculpture by Brett Murray on the cover, and Zukile Malahlana from Marekta appears on the album.

Personnel
Xhosa vocals : Zukile Malahlana
Piano: Murray Anderson
Vocals and poem on "Durgas Belt": Lesego Rampolokeng
Sample on "What have they Done To Me?" from "Shela" by Samuel Singo courtesy Gallo Records
Sitar on "Secrecy of Silence": Jaya Lakshmi
Tabla: Chaitanya Charanadas
"Slow Speed" features Brother Sjambok of "Die Vos Broers"
Clarinet on "Slow Speed": Joelle Chesselet
Operatic voice on "Coptic":Juliana Venter
"Herdsman" was originally recorded for Ochre and Water, a movie by Doxa Productions Himba.
"Faust" was originally recorded for the Handspring/ William Kentridge production of Faustus in Afrika; vocal by Jennifer Ferguson

Track listing

 "Djengele (the Generals)" 06:05
 "The Generals Walk Free" 06:57
 "Versatile Flying Options" 06:10
 "Durga (Into The Light)" 05:36
 "What Have They Done To You" 04:28
 "The Equator (Umlamli)" 06:38	
 "The Secrecy Of Science" 06:37
 "Coptic Handcross" 05:48
 "Slow Speed" 05:53
 "You're Breaking Up (Press The Hash Key)" 04:24
 "Herdsman" 07:05
 "The Quatar Depression Faust (Excerpt)" 07:58

References

External links
Official site

2003 albums
Kalahari Surfers albums